Le Rebelle is French for "the rebel". It may refer to:

 The Rebel (1931 film), a film directed by Adelqui Migliar
 The Rebel (1980 French film), a film directed by Gérard Blain

See also
 The Rebel (disambiguation)